[[File:Hackworth valvegear, Lydia, Perrygrove Railway.jpg|thumb|Lydias Hackworth valvegear]]Perrygrove Railway''' is a heritage railway of  gauge. It is located at Perrygrove Farm in the Forest of Dean, near Coleford, Gloucestershire, England. Passengers can ride on the train to use activities including a Treetop Adventure, a covered picnic and play area at Foxy Hollow, an Indoor Village with secret passages, and a den-building area in the woods.

The railway was inspired by the minimum gauge estate railways or British narrow gauge railways developed by Sir Arthur Heywood at the end of the 19th century, including his pioneering Duffield Bank Railway and the later Eaton Hall Railway. Until mid 2014, based at Perrygrove were the Heywood Collection and associated replica vehicles built by James Waterfield, including the locomotive "Ursula" and the Duffield Bank Dining Carriage. These are now in private storage offsite.

Locomotives

Steam

Diesel

Guest 4w-6DM "Dreadnought" of 1960.

Dismantled 2015, frames and bogies sold. Power unit stored for eventual rebuild.

History
Perrygrove Farm was purchased by Michael and Frances Crofts in 1993. Construction of the railway commenced in 1993, and it opened on 1 August 1996. The railway welcomes day trippers, tourists and railway enthusiasts. 

The venue has picnic and play facilities outdoors and under cover, and an indoor village with secret passages, in addition to train rides. A treasure hunt is also offered: the railway supplies a key to open a hidden box of treasure, and clues to help treasure hunters find it. Clues are scattered in the ancient woodland where real treasure was found in 1849. Santa experiences are held in a refurbished area of the carriage shed each year.

There are two sections of 1-in-29 gradient, and two of 1 in 50, and very sharp curves in places, making it an interesting journey for visitors, and challenging for loco crews. In September 2011 a passing loop was commissioned at Rookwood, allowing a 20-minute-interval service at busy times. In 2012 a long siding was laid alongside the loop at Perrygrove. In early 2013, a short, steep spur off the above siding was laid at Perrygrove ("Wharf Road"). In summer 2013, the siding at Oakiron was relaid and a short spur laid off it. A siding was laid at Rookwood, off the passing loop, to allow access to a newly seeded area suitable for marquee-type events, including wedding receptions.

The railway opened every weekend through the winter of 2012/13 for the first time, using diesel loco "Jubilee" most of the time, with steam on most operating days from Easter, see website.

Articles featuring the railway's "Estate Railway Experience" (where enthusiasts run the line as a Heywood style estate railway) appeared in editions of Miniature Railway magazine, Narrow Gauge World and Garden Railway in spring/ summer 2013, and Steam Railway'' magazine in December 2013.

The railway regularly hold wedding receptions either in a marquee at Rookwood, or the carriage shed at Perrygrove.

The railway is a member of the Wye Valley and Forest of Dean Tourism Association, which promotes tourism in the area. It is a member of the Heritage Railway Association and Britains Great Little Railways.

References

External links

Official website
Wye Valley & Forest of Dean Tourism website
photo of a steam train on the Perrygrove Railway on geograph

Heritage railways in Gloucestershire
15 in gauge railways in England
Railway lines opened in 1996
Sir Arthur Heywood